The Global Smaller Companies Trust, formerly BMO Global Smaller Companies, is a large British investment trust dedicated to investments in smaller companies on a worldwide basis. Established in 1964, the company, which was previously known as F&C Global Smaller Companies Trust, is listed on the London Stock Exchange and is a constituent of the FTSE 250 Index. The chairman is Anthony Townsend.

History
The company was established in 1964. It changed its name from F&C Global Smaller Companies plc to BMO Global Smaller Companies in November 2018, and from BMO Global Smaller Companies to The Global Smaller Companies Trust in June 2022.

References

External links
 Official site

Investment trusts of the United Kingdom
Financial services companies established in 1964